Gary Marshall may refer to:
 Garry Marshall (1934–2016), American filmmaker and actor
 Gary Marshall (politician), American politician in Idaho
 Gary Marshall (footballer), English footballer